Les Méchants Maquereaux (translated:The Naughty/Evil Mackerels or Pimps, a pun in French) are an Acadian musical group originating from New Brunswick.  The band formed in 1992 with locals Johnny Comeau, Roland Gauvin, and Cayouche with Louisiana's Zachary Richard. In 1995, they won the East Coast Music Award for Acadian Recording Artist of the Year.

References

Canadian country rock groups
Canadian folk music groups
1992 establishments in New Brunswick
Musical groups established in 1992
Musical groups from New Brunswick